Luc Maierhofer (born 24 May 2002) is an Austrian figure skater. He is the 2019 Golden Bear of Zagreb silver medalist and the 2022 Austrian national champion.

On the junior level, he is the 2016 Dragon Trophy champion, the 2016 Skate Helena silver medalist, and a two-time Austrian junior national champion (2016, 2019).

Personal life 
Maierhofer was born 24 May 2002 in Vienna, Austria. His brother, Johannes Maierhofer, and half-sister Belinda Schönberger have also competed in figure skating.

Career

Early career 
Maierhofer began learning to skate in 2008. Early in his career, he was coached by Sergei Gromov. He competed in the advanced novice ranks from autumn 2012 through March 2015.

Coached by Julia Lavrenchuk in Vienna, Maierhofer made his junior international debut in August 2015 at the ISU Junior Grand Prix in Slovakia. In March 2016, he competed at his first ISU Championship – the 2016 World Junior Championships in Debrecen, Hungary. He was ranked 30th in the short program but did not advance to the final segment. Following that season, Maierhofer relocated to Egna, Italy, to be coached by Lorenzo Magri.

2017–2018 season 
Maierhofer's senior international debut came in September at the 2017 CS Nebelhorn Trophy. He finished 26th at the competition, which served as the final qualifying opportunity for the 2018 Winter Olympics.
Ranked 41st, he was eliminated after the short program at the 2018 World Junior Championships in Sofia, Bulgaria.

2018–2019 season 
Maierhofer began his season on the JGP series, placing within the top ten at both of his assignments. At the Austrian Championships in December, he won the junior men's title and finished second to Maurizio Zandron in the senior category. He was assigned to the 2019 European Championships because Zandron was not yet eligible to represent Austria in ISU events. Maierhofer qualified to the final segment at the European Championships, which took place in January in Minsk, Belarus. He placed 21st in the short program, 19th in the free skate, and 20th overall.

In March, Maierhofer advanced to the free skate at the 2019 World Junior Championships in Zagreb, Croatia. He finished 18th after placing 14th in the short and 21st in the free. Later that month, he competed at the 2019 World Championships in Saitama, Japan. Ranked 26th in the short, he did not reach the free skate.

2021–2022 season 
Maierhofer began the Olympic season at the 2021 CS Lombardia Trophy, where he placed sixteenth. He withdrew from the 2021 CS Nebelhorn Trophy, but went on to place eighteenth at the 2021 CS Finlandia Trophy and eleventh at the 2021 CS Cup of Austria.

Programs

Competitive highlights 
CS: Challenger Series; JGP: Junior Grand Prix

Pairs With Ghedini

Men's Singles

References

External links 
 

2002 births
Austrian male single skaters
Living people
Figure skaters from Vienna
21st-century Austrian people
Competitors at the 2023 Winter World University Games